Wireframe or wire-frame may refer to:
 Wire-frame model, visual model of a three-dimensional object in computer graphics
 Website wireframe, a basic visual guide used in web design

See also
 Wire sculpture, used in plastic arts